Montclair Place is a  indoor shopping mall in Montclair, California. The mall is anchored by JCPenney and Macy's. The mall was known as Montclair Plaza until 2015.

History

At opening
Montclair Plaza was developed by contractor Ernest W. Hahn; the architect of the overall mall and shops was Burke, Kober, Nicolais & Archuleta. Three department stores anchored Montclair Plaza at, or shortly after its opening:
JCPenney, ; Burke, Kober, Nicolais & Archuleta, architects
The Broadway at the east end, ; Charles Luckman and Associates, architects
May Company at the west end, ; Welton Becket and Associates, architects

Other stores open at the Plaza's launch included branches of the junior department stores:
Silverwoods (Burke, Kober, Nicolais & Archuleta, architects), as part of an expansion at the time that also included stores Las Vegas, La Habra Fashion Square, and Palm Springs.
Mullen & Bluett

There was a General Cinemas theater complex. 

A United California Bank, Crocker Bank, Van de Kamp's Holland Dutch Bakery, drugstore, and supermarket were located across from the mall in a  strip mall on the northeast of the property.

Later development
The mall was renovated and expanded with a second level that opened on October 30, 1985. Sears was added to the mall the same year, which relocated from the Indian Hill Mall. The first Nordstrom store in San Bernardino County opened at the Montclair Plaza on May 2, 1986. May Company was converted to Robinsons-May in 1993. The Broadway became a Macy's in 1996. Macy's relocated to the Robinsons-May space in 2006 after the chains merged.

In February 2014, CIM Group acquired the mall.

In November 2015, the mall was renamed "Montclair Place" and renovations were announced. On March 1, 2018, AMC Theatres announced that it will replace the Broadway building with a new 55,000-square-foot dine-in movie theatre, the city's first indoor theatre in nearly twenty years. Multiple new stores were added, including Forever 21 and Spectrum. The Canyon, a 17,500-square-foot music and entertainment venue, and Kids Empire, an 11,000-square-foot indoor playground were added. A Lazy Dog Restaurant & Bar opened in December 2019 in the former Goodyear Tire and Rubber Company. A WinWings restaurant opened next to the Panda Express restaurant. On July 3, 2019, bowling & arcade amusement chain Round One Entertainment announced it will open a location.

In 2015, Sears Holdings spun off 235 of its properties, including the Sears at Montclair Place, into Seritage Growth Properties. 

The former Broadway store was demolished in 2018 in order to build an AMC Theatres.

On November 7, 2019, it was announced that Sears would be closing its location in the mall as part of a plan to close 96 stores nationwide. The store closed in February 2020.

On May 11, 2020, during the COVID-19 pandemic, it was announced that Nordstrom would be closing its location in the mall, leaving Macy's and JCPenney as the mall's only traditional anchors.

Transit access
Metrolink has a station located north of the mall where connections to Foothill Transit, Omnitrans, and Riverside Transit Agency Express Line 204 buses can be made.

References

Shopping malls in San Bernardino County, California
Montclair, California
Shopping malls established in 1968